St. Dairbhile's Church is a medieval church and National Monument in County Mayo, Ireland.

Location
St. Dairbhile's Church is located 2.4 km (1½ miles) south of Aughleam, on Mullet Peninsula.

History

St. Dairbhile's Church was constructed in the 6th century, although the current structure is from the 12th century.

According to legend, if someone can squeeze themselves through the west window three times, they will never die from drowning.

Legend tells us that in the 6th century St. Dairbhile (Darbiled), a native of Meath, travelled to the Mullet Peninsula to escape an admirer. However, she was followed here, and gouged out her own eyes to make herself less attractive. When her horrified lover left, she washed her eyes in the waters of a well and her sight was restored. This is St. Deirbhile’s Well, which is located nearby. A pattern takes place annually on 15 August.

Buildings
St. Dairbhile's Church is a gabled single-cell church, now in ruins. The church has a narrow ashlar-lined, deeply-splayed east window with an arcuated lintel, and a narrow west doorway with inclined jambs and arcuated lintel.

References

External links

Religion in County Mayo
Archaeological sites in County Mayo
National Monuments in County Mayo
Former churches in the Republic of Ireland